The County Courthouse of Clay County, North Carolina, is located on Main Street in Hayesville, North Carolina.  The T-shaped two-story brick building was built in 1888, and is a prominent local example of vernacular Italianate architecture.  Its most visible feature is a three-story square tower, which projects for half its width from the main facade, and through which entry to the building is gained.

The building was listed on the National Register of Historic Places in 1975.

See also
National Register of Historic Places listings in Clay County, North Carolina

Notes

References

County courthouses in North Carolina
Courthouses on the National Register of Historic Places in North Carolina
Italianate architecture in North Carolina
Government buildings completed in 1887
Buildings and structures in Clay County, North Carolina
National Register of Historic Places in Clay County, North Carolina